The Democratic Moldova Electoral Bloc (BEMD) was a centre-left electoral alliance of political parties in Moldova, led by Serafim Urechean.

Membership of the Bloc 

The alliance was formed by the following parties:
Our Moldova Alliance (Alianţă Moldova Noastră)
Democratic Party of Moldova (Partidul Democrat din Moldova)
Social Liberal Party (Partidul Social Liberal)

Parliamentary election, 2005 

At the parliamentary elections on 6 March 2005, the alliance won 444,377 votes (28.53% of the popular vote) and 34 out of 101 seats, in the XVIth legislature of the Moldovan Parliament. That enabled the alliance to pass the 12% threshold of representation.

After the elections the bloc fell apart into three parliamentary groups composed of the constituent parties.

References

External links 
  Electoral Bloc “Moldova Democrata” (BMD)

Defunct political party alliances in Moldova